This is a list of all three-country tripoints on land or internal waters. Many of the coordinates listed below are only approximate. As of 2020, there are 175 international tripoints across the whole world. Africa has 61 international tripoints (the highest number of international tripoints), followed by Asia with 51 international tripoints, Europe with 48 international tripoints, South America with 13 international tripoints and North America with two international tripoints. Brazil, Russia, India, China, Argentina, South Africa, Pakistan, Bangladesh, Nigeria, Iran, Algeria and Mexico have at least one international tripoint. Australia, Canada, Indonesia, the United Kingdom, the United States, South Korea, Japan and the Philippines have no international tripoints. Landlocked countries also have international tripoints.

List

Africa

Americas

Asia

Europe

See also

List of tripoints of England
Quadripoint
Tri-cities, for examples of cities within a country's borders.

References

External links
Borderbase

Tripoints
Tripoints
List of tripoints

de:Dreiländereck#Dreiländerecke weltweit